The following highways in Virginia have been known as State Route 21:
 State Route 21 (Virginia 1918-1933), now U.S. Route 211 and its former extension along U.S. Route 29 to Washington, D.C.
 U.S. Route 21 (Virginia), 1926 - present